is a Japanese singer and entertainer who is represented by the talent agency, Ohta Production. She is a former member of idol groups AKB48 and SDN48. She was a 1st Generation captain in SDN48.

Personal life
On November 22, 2020, Noro announced her marriage to a TV director.

Filmography

Drama

Other TV series

Films

Stage shows

Radio series

Advertisements

Internet series

Events

References

External links
 Official profile 
 Official fan club 

Japanese idols
Japanese television personalities
1983 births
Living people
People from Itabashi
21st-century Japanese women singers
21st-century Japanese singers
21st-century Japanese actresses